Philip Jonathan Hadland (born 20 October 1980) is an English retired professional footballer who played as a winger and current manager, who was last in charge of Colwyn Bay. He played for a variety of Football League clubs including Reading, where he began his career and made his debut at the age of 17 against Barnsley at the Madejski Stadium in the League Cup. He then joined Rochdale, where he made 32 appearances (his highest total for a league club), Leyton Orient, Carlisle, Brighton, Darlington and Colchester.

References

External links
 
 Phil Hadland at Colchester United Archive Database

1980 births
Living people
Footballers from Warrington
English footballers
Association football wingers
Colchester United F.C. players
Reading F.C. players
Rochdale A.F.C. players
Leyton Orient F.C. players
Carlisle United F.C. players
Brighton & Hove Albion F.C. players
Darlington F.C. players
Leek Town F.C. players
Hednesford Town F.C. players
Kidsgrove Athletic F.C. players
Colwyn Bay F.C. managers
English Football League players
English football managers